FabricLive.08 is a DJ mix compilation album by Plump DJs, as part of the FabricLive Mix Series.

Track listing

References

External links
Fabric: FabricLive.08
Allmusic: [ FabricLive.08]
Resident Advisor: FabricLive.08 review

Plump DJs albums
2003 compilation albums